Ad Infinitum were a musical group which were part of the Factory Records label. They were formed by Lindsay Reade, who was married to label manager Tony Wilson at the time. The group was composed of members of A Certain Ratio, and New Order bassist Peter Hook. 

In 1984, the group recorded its sole single, a cover of the Joe Meek song "Telstar", with the B-side being "Telstar in a Piano Bar". The song had original lyrics written by Reade in its first version, which were rejected by Meek's publishers, and replaced by more abstract and unintelligible vocals. Lindsay Reade explained:

This single was one of the first records with a holographic cover.

References 

English new wave musical groups
English pop music groups
English rock music groups
Musical groups from Manchester
Factory Records artists